The men's plain high diving was one of five diving events on the diving at the 1920 Summer Olympics programme. The competition was held on Monday, 22 August, Tuesday, 23 August, and on Thursday, 25 August 1920. Twenty-two divers from eleven nations competed.

Results

First round

The three divers who scored the smallest number of points in each group of the first round advanced to the final.

Group 1

Group 2

Group 3

Final

References

Sources
 
 

Men
1920
Men's events at the 1920 Summer Olympics